The Most Exalted Supreme Royal Family Order of Terengganu (Bahasa Melayu: Darjah Utama Kerabat Diraja Terengganu Yang Amat Dihormati) is an honorific order of the Sultanate of Terengganu

History 
It was founded by Sultan Mahmud of Terengganu on 10 March 1981.

Classes 
It is awarded and limited to ruling princes, in one class: 
 Member (Ahli) - D.K.T.

Insignia 
The sash is worn from the left shoulder to the right hip.

Recipients
 Sultan Hassanal Bolkiah of Brunei (1980)

Grand Masters
 Mahmud of Terengganu
 Mizan Zainal Abidin of Terengganu

Supreme Royal Family Order
 Mahmud of Terengganu
 Mizan Zainal Abidin of Terengganu
 Tengku Muhammad Ismail

References 

Supreme Royal Family Order